Stokesley School is a coeducational secondary school and sixth form located in Stokesley, North Yorkshire, England.

It was established in 1959 as secondary modern school but became a comprehensive in the 1970s. The school converted to academy status in April 2015, however it continues to coordinate with North Yorkshire County Council for admissions, and has an intake of pupils from Stokesley, Great Ayton, Hutton Rudby and the surrounding villages.

Stokesley School offers GCSEs, BTECs ASDAN courses as programmes of study for pupils, while students in the sixth form have the option to study from a range of A-levels.

Notable former pupils
Joe Bennett, footballer
Tom Chadwick, cricketer
David Jones, sports broadcaster
Maimie McCoy, actress
Alan Milburn, politician
Pierce Phillips, rugby league player
Harry and Charlie Tanfield, cyclists
 Neave Applebaum, songwriter and music producer. Co writer and co-producer of songs such as Head & Heart, “BED” and “Out Out” by Joel Corry

References

External links
Stokesley School official website

Secondary schools in North Yorkshire
Educational institutions established in 1959
1959 establishments in England
Academies in North Yorkshire
Stokesley